Roger Pope (died 1647) was an English politician who sat in the House of Commons in 1647. He fought in the Parliamentary army in the English Civil War.

Personal life 
Pope was possibly the son of Thomas Pope of Shrewsbury and his wife Luciad Edwards, daughter of Thomas Edwards of Shrewsbury.

Pope married a daughter of Thomas Mytton.

Career 
He fought in the Parliamentarian army in the Civil War, assisting General Thomas Mytton in North Wales. In 1646 he was a colonel and was appointed governor of Holt Castle after its capture in January 1647.

In 1647, Pope was elected Member of Parliament for Merioneth in the Long Parliament.

Death 
He died a few months after being elected Member of Parliament.

References

Year of birth missing
1647 deaths
Members of the Parliament of England (pre-1707) for constituencies in Wales
English MPs 1640–1648
Politicians from Shrewsbury
Roundheads